A time bomb is a bomb whose detonation is triggered by a timer.

Time bomb, Time Bomb, or Timebomb may also refer to:

Film 
 Time Bomb (1953 film) or Terror on a Train, a British film
 Time Bomb (1984 film), an American TV film starring Billy Dee Williams
 Timebomb (1991 film), an American science fiction action film
 Time Bomb (1994 film), an Indian Kannada action thriller film
 Time Bomb, a 1996 Indian film starring Puneet Issar
 Time Bomb (2006 film), a thriller film
 Time Bomb, a 2008 direct-to-video film starring Jake Busey

Literature 
 Time Bomb (Alex Delaware), a 1990 murder mystery novel in the Alex Delaware series by Jonathan Kellerman
 Time Bomb (Hinton novel), a 2005 young adult novel by Nigel Hinton
 Time Bomb, a 1955 science fiction novel by Wilson Tucker
 Time Bomb, a 2008 spy novel by Gerald Seymour

Music
Time Bomb Recordings, a record label

Albums 
 Timebomb (album), a 1991 album by U.D.O.
 Time Bomb (Demolition Hammer album) (1994)
 Time Bomb (Buckcherry album) (2001) or its title track
 Time Bomb (Alyssa Reid album) (2014)

Songs
"Timebomb" (Beck song), 2007
"Timebomb" (Chumbawamba song), 1993
"Timebomb" (Tove Lo song), 2015
"Timebomb" (Kylie Minogue song), 2012
"Timebomb" (Walk the Moon song), 2019
"Time B.O.M.B.", a 2014 song by Nekfeu
"Time Bomb" (Rancid song), 1995
"Time-Bomb", a song by All Time Low from Dirty Work
"Time Bomb", a song by Annihilator from Carnival Diablos
"Timebomb", a song by Coldrain from The Revelation
"Time Bomb", a song by the Dave Matthews Band from Big Whiskey & the GrooGrux King
"Time Bomb", a song by the Dismemberment Plan from Change
"Timebomb", a song by Dog Faced Hermans
"Time Bomb", a song by Sheena Easton from What Comes Naturally
"Timebomb", a song by 808 State from Gorgeous
"Time Bomb", a song by Faber Drive from Seven Second Surgery
"Time Bomb", a song by the Format from Dog Problems
"Timebomb", a song by Alastair Galbraith and Graeme Jefferies
"Time Bomb", a song by Goldspot from Tally of the Yes Men
"Time Bomb", a song by Godsmack from Godsmack
"Time Bomb", a song by Jessy Greene from A Demon & Her Lovers
"Time Bomb", a song by Johnny and the Hurricanes
"Time Bomb", a song by Lake from Lake
"Timebomb", a song by Nantucket from Long Way to the Top
"Timebomb", a song by Ohgr from Devils in my Details
"Timebomb", a song by Old 97's from Too Far to Care
"Timebomb", a 2012 song by Pink from The Truth About Love
"Time Bomb", a song by The Ramones from Subterranean Jungle
"Timebomb", a song by Royal Crescent Mob from Midnight Rose's
"Time Bomb", a song by Screeching Weasel from How to Make Enemies and Irritate People
"Timebomb", a song by Selena
"Time Bomb", a song by 311 from Universal Pulse
"Timebomb", a song by Laidback Luke and Jonathan Mendelsohn.

Software
Time bomb (software), a type of computer program written so that it will stop functioning after a certain date
Timebomb (video game), a 1984 game for the 16K ZX Spectrum computer

Television 
 Time Bomb (1984 film), a 1984 TV film starring Joseph Bottoms
 Time Bombs, a 2008 Canadian documentary
 Time Bomb 9/11, a 2005 Indian television serial based on 24
 "Time Bomb" (240-Robert), a 1979 episode of 240-Robert
 "Time Bombs" (All Saints 1999 episode)
 "Time Bomb" (All Saints 2005 episode)
 "Time Bombs" (All Saints 2008 episode)
 "Time Bomb" (Angel), a 2004 episode of Angel
 "Time Bomb", a 1983 episode of Aura Battler Dunbine
 "Time Bomb" (The Bill), a 2010 episode of The Bill
 "Time Bomb" (The Closer), a 2008 episode of The Closer
 "Time Bomb" (CSI: Miami), a 2010 episode of CSI: Miami
 "Time Bomb", a 1963 episode of Dixon of Dock Green
 "Time Bomb", a 2002 episode of Doctors
 "Time Bomb" (Earth: Final Conflict), a 2000 episode of Earth: Final Conflict
 "Time Bombs" (Extreme Universe), a 2010 episode of Extreme Universe
 "Time Bomb" (Falcon Crest), a 1990 episode of Falcon Crest
 "Time Bomb" (The F.B.I.), a 1970 episode of The F.B.I.
 "Time Bomb" (Fireside Theater), a 1949 episode of Fireside Theatre
 "Time Bomb" (The Flash), a 2019 episode of The Flash
 "Time Bomb", a 1968 episode of Garrison's Gorillas
 "Time Bomb" (Gotham), a 2016 episode of Gotham
 "Time Bomb", a 1954 episode of The Grove Family
 "Time Bomb" (Hardball), a 1989 episode of Hardball
 "Time Bomb", a 1976 episode of Matlock Police
 "Time Bomb" (Mission: Impossible), a 1969 episode of Mission: Impossible
 "Time Bomb", a 2004 episode of Neighbours
 "Time Bomb" (The Odyssey), a 1994 episode of The Odyssey
 "Time Bomb", a 2011 episode of One Man Army
 "Time Bomb", a 1954 episode of The Philco-Goodyear Television Playhouse
 "Time Bomb" (Sailor Moon), a 1995 episode of Sailor Moon
 "Time Bomb (Shadow Raiders), a 1999 episode of Shadow Raiders
 "Time Bomb" (Special Branch), a 1969 episode of Special Branch
 "Time Bomb" (S.W.A.T.), a 1975 episode of S.W.A.T.
 "Timebomb" (True Blood), a 2009 episode of True Blood
 "Time Bomb", a 1956 episode of Telephone Time
 "Time Bomb" (Vega$), a 1981 episode of Vega$
 "Time Bomb" (Voyage to the Bottom of the Sea), a 1965 episode of the TV series Voyage to the Bottom of the Sea
 "Time Bomb" (Wolverine and the X-Men), a 2008 episode of Wolverine and the X-Men
 "Time Bomb" (Wonder Woman), a 1978 episode of Wonder Woman
 "Time Bomb" (World of Giants), a 1959 episode of World of Giants

See also
 Le vent se lève, a 1959 French-Italian film starring Curd Jürgens